K-525 Arkhangelsk was an Oscar I-class  nuclear-powered cruise missile submarine of the Soviet Navy, and later the Russian Navy. She was the first of the two Oscar I (the Soviet classification was Project 949 Granit) vessels constructed, the other being K-206. A further 11 submarines of an improved class, Project 949A (Antey) (called Oscar II by NATO), were subsequently constructed.

The submarine was placed in reserve in 1991, and decommissioned in 1996. Scrapping of the boats at Sevmash started in January 2004, funded by the British Government under the Cooperative Threat Reduction program. They had been reduced to a three-compartment unit (of the original ten watertight compartments) by 2006.

References

Oscar-class submarines
Ships built by Sevmash
1980 ships
Ships of the Russian Northern Fleet